EFH may refer to:
 EF Hutton, an American stock brokerage firm
 Energy Future Holdings, an American electric utility
 Essential fish habitat